Dracula trichroma is a species of orchid found in Colombia, Western South America, Southern America and Ecuador. It is in the sub tribe of  Pleurothallidinae which is within the tribe of Epidendreae. It is also in the sub family of Epidendroideae.

References

trichroma